Good Eats is an American television cooking show, created and hosted by Alton Brown, which aired in North America on Food Network and later Cooking Channel. Likened to television science educators Mr. Wizard and Bill Nye, Brown explores the science and technique behind the cooking, the history of different foods, and the advantages of different kinds of cooking equipment. The show tends to focus on familiar dishes that can easily be made at home, and also features segments on choosing the right appliances, and getting the most out of inexpensive, multi-purpose tools. Each episode has a distinct theme, which is typically an ingredient or a certain cooking technique, but may also be a more general theme such as Thanksgiving. In the tenth anniversary episode, Brown stated that the show was inspired by the idea of combining Julia Child, Mr. Wizard, and Monty Python. On May 11, 2011, Brown confirmed that the series would come to an end, ceasing production at episode 249. Good Eats is the third longest running Food Network series, behind 30 Minute Meals and Barefoot Contessa.

In 2018, Cooking Channel premiered a spin-off, Good Eats: Reloaded, which combines footage from past episodes with new segments commenting on advances in cooking science and knowledge that had occurred since the original airdate. In 2019, the series was revived, with a new season premiering on Food Network on August 25, 2019. The second season of the revival became an exclusive offering from the Discovery+ streaming service.

Format
The show had a distinct visual style involving Dutch angles and shots from cameras placed inside and on various items in the kitchen, including the ovens, refrigerator, and microwave oven. In some episodes, Brown and other actors play various characters to tell the story of the food. For example, in the episode "The Big Chili," Brown played a cowboy trying to rustle up the ideal pot of chili. In the episode "Give Peas a Chance" (a parody of The Exorcist), Brown plays a Father Merrin-like character who tries to convince a "possessed" child to eat (and like) peas. In other episodes Brown is simply himself, but interacts with fictional characters such as his eggplant- and tomato-wielding neighbor Mr. McGregor, or a city councilman who refuses to eat fudge. He also uses various makeshift teaching aids to demonstrate scientific concepts. They also feature many episodes where the ingredients themselves are portrayed by actors, represented by an agent who uses Brown to "gussy up" these foods for mainstream appeal.

Episodes of Good Eats typically began with an introductory monologue or skit that leads into the phrase "good eats." The show often closed with the phrase as well. For the first several seasons, Brown himself would say the words "good eats." Since approximately season seven, however, Brown avoids saying "good eats" at the end of the intro, stopping just short and allowing the main title graphics to complete the phrase.

Episodes were primarily set in the (fictional) kitchen of Brown's house, although his actual home kitchen was used in "Give Peas a Chance." In seasons 1–4, the episodes were shot in the actual home kitchen of Brown's original partners in the Atlanta, Georgia, area. In season 5, taping moved to the new home of the show's Line Producer (Dana Popoff) and Director of Photography (Marion Laney), in which they built a much larger and more versatile kitchen for taping. A  section of the island was built for the show and placed on wheels, so it can be moved (or removed) for various shots, and a  grid of pipe was hung from the ceiling, for easier placement of cameras and microphones. Starting with season 7, the show moved, this time to an exact replica of the previous kitchen and surrounding areas of the home, built on a sound stage. In the "Behind the Eats" special, Brown said that complaints by Popoff's neighbors (not adjacent neighbors but at the end of the block) prompted the move. The stove top and the sink are the only functioning pieces in this kitchen. Many of the other appliances have even had part of their backs removed, so shots of Brown can be taken from inside cabinets, ovens, and refrigerators. This change was generally not known until after season 7 started airing when the house used in season 5–6 was put on eBay for sale. It was then revealed that they had moved. It is generally thought that in the "Q" episode on barbecue that was taped in Brown's Airstream trailer, when Brown says that they are "building the set for Good Eats: The Motion Picture" this is in reality a reference to the new house set. The set was not officially unveiled on the show as a set until "Curious Yet Tasty Avocado Experiments."

Incidental music during the show is typically a variation of the show's theme, which in turn was inspired by music from the film Get Shorty. There are dozens of variations of the theme played throughout, crossing all genres of music, including the keypad tones in "Mission: Poachable" and nearly every incidence where a countdown of ten seconds is used. New music is composed for each episode by Patrick Belden of Belden Music and Sound. Brown met Belden while working on other projects before Brown's culinary training.

Each episode also featured tidbits, text pieces containing trivia related to the food or cooking technique featured in the episode. These are always shown just before ad breaks, and are often shown between major transitions in location or cooking action. The information presented is usually notes about the history of the food or technique, helpful cooking hints, or technical or scientific information which would be too detailed or dry to include as part of the show's live content.

During the show's first seasons, at the end of each episode Brown would give a summary of the important points covered during the episode; these points would be shown on the screen as he talked. These summaries still appear in later seasons from time to time, but rarely have the textual accompaniment. Brown also traveled to food manufacturing facilities frequently in the first few seasons to talk with experts about the foods being featured. In later seasons, he still visits farms, groves, and other places food is grown as well as processing plants and other factories, but less frequently.

Beginning in season 9, episodes have been recorded in high definition, and these episodes also appear on Food Network HD.

Cast and crew
A staple feature of Good Eats is the presence of several recurring characters who play important roles on the show, from Brown's relatives and neighbors to various nemeses. In season 9, the episode "Behind the Eats" offered a backstage look at the show's production and revealed the origin of several characters. In the episode, Brown stated that all of the show's staff members have appeared on camera at some point.

Several members of Brown's real-life family have appeared on the show. His mother had a walk-on part; his daughter, Zoey, has appeared in several episodes; and his late grandmother, "Ma" Mae Skelton, co-hosted the biscuit episode "The Dough Also Rises." Even his Basset Hound and iguana have shown up in a couple of episodes. However, his then-wife DeAnna (who is also the show's executive producer) has never appeared in an episode,  though she was mentioned in "Where There's Smoke, There's Fish." Specialists who hold real-life positions commonly appeared as themselves to provide Brown with useful information on the topic at hand.

Recurring characters

Fictional

Real

Brown plays other roles from time to time, often consisting of him explaining something in the foreground while another Alton Brown demonstrates in the background (similar to the technique used to present B.A. Brown). Sometimes he participates in an on-screen skit to re-enact such topics as cavemen discovering cooking techniques, while providing a voice-over narrative. At other times Brown talks to another character played by himself, with the camera cutting between the two as each delivers his lines, for instance, when he is (also) playing a Government Agent.

History
Two pilot episodes for Good Eats (" Steak Your Claim" and "This Spud's For You") aired on the Chicago, Illinois, PBS affiliate WTTW-TV in July 1998.

The show was discovered by Food Network when an executive saw a clip of the show on the Eastman Kodak website which used the clip to showcase a new type of film stock sold by the company. The show was picked up in July 1999 by Food Network, which then owned exclusive rights to the show. The back catalog of shows were added to the repeat rotation of sister network Cooking Channel in the fall of 2011, and Brown announced that his contract with Food Network had expired and moved to Cooking Channel in 2011. 

New episodes aired on Wednesdays in the late evenings from 1999 to 2007, when they were moved to Mondays at 8 p.m. From July 9, 2007, until summer 2009, at least two different episodes aired each weeknight (8 p.m. and 11 p.m., along with late-night replays at 2 a.m.), with a third airing on Wednesday nights at 8:30 p.m.; additional episodes were occasionally added (usually coinciding with a Food Network series or event).

On October 10, 2009, Good Eats celebrated its 10th anniversary with an hour-long live stage show aired on the Food Network. Guests included Ted Allen of Food Detectives and Chopped.  One of the demonstrations in the show proved that a fire extinguisher was not a unitasker, as Brown constantly repeated in regular episodes that the fire extinguisher was the only unitasker in the kitchen.

On the January 4, 2010, episode, Good Eats revealed Brown's changed eating habits that led to his losing  in 9 months. Brown emphasized that he was not on a diet in the modern American sense of the word (a temporary change in eating habits), but in the original Greek meaning (a permanent shift). Brown went on to describe a regimen that prescribes certain healthful foods with specific degrees of regularity (daily, once every two days, etc.) while proscribing unhealthy foods. Prescribed foods included breakfast every day (usually a fruit smoothie), oily fish, whole grains, etc. The episode comically claimed the entire story was in Brown's new book, Buff Like Me.

Reception
Good Eats was nominated for the James Beard Foundation's "Best T.V. Food Journalism Award" in 2000, and the series earned a Peabody Award in 2006. "Rarely has science been taught on TV in such an entertaining – and appetizing – manner as it is in Alton Brown's goofy, tirelessly inventive series."

In 2011, Brown was given the James Beard Award for Best TV Food Personality for his work on Good Eats.

End of the first run
On May 9, 2011, Brown announced via his Twitter that he was "retiring" the show after 249 episodes, and there would be three new one-hour episodes to be produced and premiered in 2011. The back catalog of shows were added to the repeat rotation of sister network Cooking Channel in the fall of 2011, and Brown announced that his contract with Food Network had expired and moved to Cooking Channel in 2011.

The crew of the show with their families were shown at the end of the first hour-long episodes ("Right On Q") eating BBQ while Brown narrated that truly a BBQ is just an event meant to be shared with friends and family. In the special Thanksgiving episode of 2011, "Reromancing the Bird," favorite characters of the show—sister Marsha, niece Marsha Jr., neighbor Chuck, the southerner Uncle Colonel Bob Boatwright, the food agent Sid, Frances Andersen portraying Uncle Bob's nurse, and the Dungeon Master—reappeared for a last time as a final tribute to their contribution to the show. At the end of the final episode, for the first time in years, Brown did not finish the show with the line "see you next time on Good Eats." Instead, he said, "Stay dark, America," snapped his fingers, and the screen went dark.

The final episode of Good Eats, titled "Turn on the Dark," was aired February 10, 2012. Brown announced via Facebook earlier that day at approximately 2:00 p.m. EST:

When asked about the end of the show on the August 29, 2012, episode of The Nerdist Podcast, Brown stated "I've put Good Eats into cryogenic holding. I'm not saying it's gone. I didn't shoot it in the head, I didn't kill it, but after 13 solid years of production, I needed a break."

In an interview with Larry King, Brown said "I crossed the 250-episode line, and I realized that I was tired. It was a very stressful show to make; it was completely scripted, we did between 300 and 600 pages of research. I can only do 22 a year, because they were very involved. We shot them like movies, single-camera I crossed that line, and I also kind of saw the writing on the wall, I think, which was that the era of the instructional or educational culinary show was frankly coming to an end in primetime. I think I saw that primetime food shows were going to go to competitions and reality. I would have rather put it out to pasture than be cancelled."

Good Eats: The Return and Good Eats: Reloaded
Brown addressed the future of Good Eats at the end of a video he posted to his official Facebook page on July 16, 2015. In response to fan questions, Brown replied: "You want to see Good Eats again? Get in touch with the Food Network. Tell them you want it. Tell them I sent you."

On Alton's 2016 book tour, he stated Good Eats will have a "sequel," and it would be released the next year on the Internet.

On September 3, 2017 at the annual Dragon Con convention in Atlanta, Georgia, Alton Brown announced the successor of Good Eats. The new 30-minute show, then titled Good Eats: Return of the Eats, would air on the Food Network while additional content would be available online. Brown made the announcement while surrounded by several members of the production and on-air teams responsible for Good Eats, including Vickie Eng, Widdi Turner, and Lucky Yates. Return of the Eats was to debut in 2018, but was pushed back to 2019. On June 3, 2019, Brown announced via social media that the show, now titled Good Eats: The Return, would debut Sunday, August 25, at 10 PM ET. The first episode was, however, premiered early on Food Network's official YouTube channel on August 21, 2019 before its television debut. The episode reached number one on the worldwide YouTube trending list within hours.

On October 15, 2018, Cooking Channel premiered a spin-off series, Good Eats: Reloaded, featuring Brown revisiting 13 past episodes of the series with new scenes and recipes reflecting advancements in techniques and knowledge since their original airings. The second season, spotlighting and re-working 13 more episodes, premiered on April 13, 2020.

On August 6, 2020, Brown announced on Facebook that a new season of Good Eats: The Return had begun production, with new episodes due out either in late 2020 or early 2021. This second season premiered as a Discovery+ exclusive in early 2021, but by June 2021 had started airing on Food Network alongside a special Alton-led Chopped tournament called "Alton's Maniacal Baskets". A special one-hour Halloween-themed episode, "The House That Dripped Chocolate", aired on October 8, 2020. On July 13, 2021, the final episodes of Good Eats: The Return aired on Food Network; Brown commented on his Facebook page that these episodes would not only be the end of Good Eats: The Return but the conclusion of all Good Eats programming.

Merchandise

VHS and DVD

Books
American publishers Stewart, Tabori and Chang released three separate volumes compiling the bulk of recipes featured on the television show. All of the recipes were transcribed and updated by Alton Brown. The first book, Good Eats: The Early Years was released in October 2009 and featured an original cover art by illustrator Michael Koelsch. It covered the first 80 episodes. The second book, Good Eats 2: The Middle Years was released a year later in October 2010 and featured an original cover art by illustrator Jim Salvati depicting Brown in a James Bond spoof. It covered episodes 81 through 164 and was packaged with a bonus DVD. The third book, Good Eats 3: The Later Years, was released another year later in October 2011 and featured an original cover art by illustrator Michael Koelsch depicting Brown in an Indiana Jones spoof. It covered episodes 165 through 249.

In early 2011, the first two books were packaged into a boxed set titled Good Eats: Two-Volume Set - Episodes 1 Through 164. In October 2013, all three books were packaged into an updated boxed set titled Good Eats: Three-Volume Set - The Complete Episodes.

In June 2021, on an episode of his QQ online series, he said he was putting the finishing touches on the manuscript of what he called "the fourth and final Good Eats book", which will presumably cover recipes from "Turn on the Dark" (the final original Good Eats episode which was not included in The Later Years for some reason) and both seasons of Good Eats: The Return.

Episode guide

References

External links
Cooking Channel official site
Food Network official site
Good Eats Fan Page - including comprehensive episode guide, equipment lists, and a forum.

1990s American cooking television series
1999 American television series debuts
2000s American cooking television series
2010s American cooking television series
2020s American cooking television series
2012 American television series endings
2019 American television series debuts
Food Network original programming
American television series revived after cancellation
Peabody Award-winning television programs
Television shows set in the United States